Mount Carmel Christian School is a private Christian school located in Mount Pleasant, Pennsylvania, United States.  The school provides accelerated education in a private school environment.  It offers education to all grades from kindergarten throughout High School.

Building History 
The school was founded in 1974, and started with 27 students that year. Classes were held in the church at that time. Later, a mobile building was added. Finally, in 1981, the present building, Pritts Hall opened. Pritts Hall is complete with ten classrooms, a science lab, library, gymnasium, and a computer lab with internet access. Outside elements include both a playground and soccer field.

Athletics 
Mount Carmel has the following athletic offerings at the school.:

Alumni 
The school is noted in the local region for its strong academic output. Graduates have attended a wide range of schools including Grove City College, St. Vincent College, US Air Force Academy, and most recently Vassar College.

References

External links
Mount Carmel Christian School

Christian schools in Pennsylvania
Private elementary schools in Pennsylvania
Private middle schools in Pennsylvania
Private high schools in Pennsylvania
Schools in Westmoreland County, Pennsylvania
Educational institutions established in 1974
1974 establishments in Pennsylvania